Omar Abdel Megeed (born 19 August 2005) is a professional footballer who plays as an attacking midfielder for 2. Bundesliga club Hamburger SV. Born in Germany, he represents Egypt at youth international level.

Club career
Megeed is a youth academy graduate of Hamburger SV. He made his professional debut for the club on 13 August 2022 in a 2–0 league win against Arminia Bielefeld. This made him the youngest player to appear in an official match for the club, a record which was previously held by Josha Vagnoman.

International career
Born in Germany to Egyptian parents, Megeed represents Egypt at youth international level. In March 2022, he received his first call-up to the Egypt under-20 team. He made his debut for the team on 24 March in a 1–0 friendly match defeat against Slovakia.

Career statistics

References

External links
 
 Omar Megeed at DFB 
Bundesliga profile

2005 births
Living people
Footballers from Hamburg
Egyptian footballers
Egypt youth international footballers
German footballers
German people of Egyptian descent
Association football midfielders
Hamburger SV players
2. Bundesliga players